New Winston Museum is a local-history museum in the city of Winston-Salem in the U.S. state of North Carolina. The museum's focus is on Winston-Salem and Forsyth County history from 1850 to the present. The museum is currently working on opening a new, permanent home, and is not presently open to the public. During the transition period, New Winston Museum is still conducting public programs at locations throughout the community. 

The museum offices are located at 418 N. Marshall Street, Ste. 204 in Winston-Salem.

References

External links
 

Museums in Winston-Salem, North Carolina
History museums in North Carolina